The one hundred thirty-eighth Connecticut House of Representatives district elects one member of the Connecticut House of Representatives. Its current representative is Ken Gucker.

List of representatives

Recent election results

2022

2020

See also 
 List of members of the Connecticut General Assembly from Norwalk

References

138
Danbury, Connecticut